Abaimovo is a rural locality (a selo) in Lopatinsky Selsoviet of Sergachsky District, Russia. The population was 145 as of 2010. There are 3 streets.

Geography 
Abaimovo is located 38 km southwest of Sergach (the district's administrative centre) by road. Pitsa is the nearest rural locality.

History of title 
The name came from the Erzya name Abaim.

References 

Rural localities in Nizhny Novgorod Oblast
Sergachsky District